The Kirklees Way is a 72-mile (115 km) waymarked footpath in Kirklees metropolitan district, West Yorkshire, England.  It was opened in 1990 and includes the upper Colne Valley, Spen Valley and Holme Valley.

The Peak District Boundary Walk follows the Kirklees Way for a few miles either side of Holme.

References

Further reading

External links

 Long Distance Walkers Association  record for the Kirklees Way

Tourist attractions in Kirklees
Long-distance footpaths in England
Protected areas of West Yorkshire
Footpaths in West Yorkshire